Emeritus Professor Susan (Sue) Mary Stocklmayer, is a science communicator who served as Director of the Centre for the Public Awareness of Science at the Australian National University (ANU) from 1998 to 2015.

Early life and education
Born in Zambia, Stocklmayer completed her undergraduate education at the University of London with a Bachelor of Science in physics and chemistry. With her family, she migrated to Australia in 1982 and settled in Western Australia. There she attended Curtin University studying for a graduate diploma in applied science and masters of philosophy (MPhil). She was awarded a PhD in 1994, together with the Curtin University graduate medal.

Career

Stocklmayer began her career as a physics teacher, before moving into science communication. On graduating with her PhD, she joined the Australian National University in 1994 as lecturer in science communication. She became Director of the Centre for the Public Awareness of Science in 1998. 

She has been editor-in-chief of The International Journal of Science Education (Part B): Communication and Public Engagement since 2010. In 2011 Stocklmayer became Australia's first chair in science communication.

Awards and recognition

 2004 Australia Day Honours, named Member of the Order of Australia (AM) "for service to science and to the community through the development of programs to raise public awareness of scientific ideas and issues and by encouraging young people, particularly girls, to enter the field."

 2010 invited to the membership of the international Faraday Club.

 2016 Australia Day Honours, named Officer of the Order of Australia (AO) "For distinguished service to science communication and education through the development of academic outreach programs and public awareness initiatives, both nationally and internationally."

Sue Stocklmayer Prize for Science Communication Major 
In 2013 the Sue Stocklmayer Prize for Science Communication Major was established in recognition of Stocklmayer's career achievements. It is awarded annually to the student, Australian or international, who receives the highest aggregate mark in their major in science communication.

Winners
 2013:  Aneeta Nathan
 2014:  Caroline Faulder
 2015:  Adam Huttner-Koros
 2016:  Michaela Ripper
 2018: Lamis Kazak
 2019: Georgia Elliot
 2020: Isabel Richards
 2020: Rebeca Claire Ganon
 2020: Andrew David Ray
 2021: Ella Louise McCarthy

Publications

References

Curtin University alumni
Alumni of the University of London
Year of birth missing (living people)
Academic staff of the Australian National University
Australian science writers
Living people
Members of the Order of Australia
Officers of the Order of Australia